Mirabella Eclano is an Italian town and comune of the province of Avellino, in the Southern Italian Campania region.  its population was of 7,904.

History

The Roman site of Aeclanum once stood nearby. It is now an archaeological park and lies in the frazione of Passo di Mirabella.

Geography
Mirabella is located 46 kilometers far from the provincial capital, Avellino, and 30 from Benevento. The municipality, located near the Province of Benevento, borders with Apice, Bonito, Calvi, Fontanarosa, Grottaminarda, Sant'Angelo all'Esca, Taurasi, Torre Le Nocelle, and Venticano.

It counts the hamlets (frazioni) of Calore (shared with Venticano), Passo di Mirabella, and Pianopantano. Passo di Mirabella, located on the national highway "SS 90", represents the municipal commercial area.

People
Julian of Eclanum (c. 386 – c. 455), bishop of Aeclanum

See also
 Irpinia

References

External links

Cities and towns in Campania